Many elm (Ulmus) trees of various kinds have attained great size or otherwise become particularly noteworthy; among these are the following.

American Elm Ulmus americana
Most of North America's notable elms are Ulmus americana, a fast-growing and long-lived species capable of attaining great size in a few centuries, especially when open-grown. American Forests, a non-profit conservation organization, uses the following formula to calculate a point score for each tree to permit comparisons with others:Trunk Circumference (in inches) + Height (in feet) + 1/4 Average Crown Spread (in feet) = Total Points

State champion American elm trees
The list of United States state champion American elm trees below tabulates each of the above characteristics, as well as the total points awarded to each tree.

Other lists of American elm trees
Other notable American elm trees include:

 The Treaty Elm, Philadelphia, Pennsylvania. In what is now Penn Treaty Park, the founder of Pennsylvania, William Penn, is said to have entered into a treaty of peace in 1683 with the native Lenape Turtle Clan under a picturesque elm tree immortalized in a painting by Benjamin West. West made the tree, already a local landmark, famous by incorporating it into his painting after hearing legends (of unknown veracity) about the tree being the location of the treaty. No documentary evidence exists of any treaty Penn signed beneath a particular tree. On 6 March 1810 a great storm blew the tree down. Wood from the tree was made into furniture, canes, walking sticks and various trinkets that Philadelphians kept as relics.
 The Washington Elm, Cambridge, Massachusetts. George Washington is said to have taken command of the American Continental Army under the Washington Elm in Cambridge on 3 July 1775. The tree survived until the 1920s and "was thought to be a survivor of the primeval forest". In 1872, a large branch fell from it and was used to construct a pulpit for a nearby church. The tree, an American White Elm, became a celebrated attraction, with its own plaque, a fence constructed around it and a road moved in order to help preserve it. The tree was cut down (or fell – sources differ) in October 1920 after an expert determined it was dead. The city of Cambridge had plans for it to be "carefully cut up and a piece sent to each state of the country and to the District of Columbia and Alaska," according to The Harvard Crimson. As late as the early 1930s, garden shops advertised that they had cuttings of the tree for sale, although the accuracy of the claims has been doubted. A Harvard "professor of plant anatomy" examined the tree rings days after the tree was felled and pronounced it between 204 and 210 years old, making it at most 62 years old when Washington took command of the troops at Cambridge. In 1896, an alumnus of the University of Washington obtained a rooted cutting of the Cambridge tree and sent it to Professor Edmund Meany at the university. The cutting was planted, cuttings were then taken from it, including one planted on 18 February 1932, the 200th anniversary of the birth of George Washington, for whom Washington state is named. That tree remains on the campus of the Washington State Capitol. Just to the west of the tree is a small elm from a cutting made in 1979.

 "Herbie" in Yarmouth, Maine, stood by present-day East Main Street (Route 88) from 1793 to 2010. At  in height, it was believed to be, between 1997 and the date of its felling, the oldest and tallest Ulmus americana in New England. The tree, which partially stood in the front yard of a private residence, had a  circumference and (until mid-2008) a  crown spread. As of 2003, only twenty of Yarmouth's original 739 elms had survived Dutch elm disease. In August 2009 it was revealed that, after battling fifteen bouts of Dutch elm disease, the tree had lost, and on 19 January 2010 it was cut down.
 The Liberty Tree, an elm on Boston Common in Boston, Massachusetts, was a rallying point for the growing resistance to the rule of England over the American colonies.
 The Great Elm on Boston Common, supposed to have been in existence before the settlement of Boston, at the time of its destruction by the storm of 15 February 1876 measured  in circumference.
 George Washington's Elm, Washington, D.C.  George Washington supposedly had a favorite spot under an elm tree near the United States Capitol Building from which he would watch construction of the building. The elm stood near the Senate wing of the Capitol building until 1948.
 The Logan Elm stood near Circleville, Ohio. Weakened by Dutch elm disease, the tree died in 1964 from storm damage. The Logan Elm State Memorial commemorates the site and preserves various associated markers and monuments. According to tradition, Chief Logan of the Mingo tribe delivered a passionate speech at a peace-treaty meeting under this elm in 1774, said to be the most famous speech ever given by a Native American.
 The Sauble Elm. The tree succumbed to Dutch elm disease and was felled in 1968. A ring count established that it had begun life in the year 1701.
 The "Great Elm Tree" at Phillips Academy in Andover, Massachusetts is believed to have been standing for at least 200 years. It is being well cared for and receives regular treatments for Dutch elm disease.

 The Johnstown Elm, in Johnstown, New York, as of September 2013 did not show any signs of Dutch elm disease. In October 2018 all that remained was a weathered stump, cut perhaps two years earlier. It grew in the front yard of a house in a small upstate city, and was probably over 200 years old. See photo at right.
 The Philipsburg Elm, Philipsburg, Quebec, was a 280-year-old  Ulmus americana, dubbed "the king of elms". It was cut down in March 2009 after death from Dutch elm disease.
 "Elmo", Brown University, Providence, Rhode Island, a large elm that "once defined the Thayer Street entrance to Brown's new Watson Institute for International and Public Affairs," contracted Dutch elm disease and was torn down in December 2003, according to a campus news release. The tree "was thought to have been between 80 and 100 years old. Wood from the tree, one of the largest on campus, was used in various student art projects."
 The Association Island Elm, New York state. The General Electric think tank organization, the Elfun Society, founded in 1928 at Association Island in the Thousand Islands area of northern New York state, is named after a famous elm tree on the  isle. The tree died in the 1970s, but it survives in the elm tree logo still used by Elfun.

 The Tabletop Elm in Provo, Utah. Immediately south of the Utah County Administration Building and just east of the Historic Utah County Courthouse in downtown Provo resides possibly a one-of-a-kind elm tree. Officially it is a specimen of Ulmus americana, but is unusual because it grows sideways, making it a "tabletop" elm tree. The tree was planted in 1927, and currently its several branches are supported by specialized braces to allow movement and growth. Every fall seven dump truck loads are required to remove all the leaves. Both reproduction and cloning efforts have been unsuccessful; the tree's seeds do not mature into the tabletop shape.
 New Haven, Connecticut, had the first public tree planting program in America, producing a canopy of mature trees (including some large elms) that gave New Haven the nickname "The Elm City". This later gave rise to the Yale song, Neath the Elms.
 The current Tree Register of the British Isles (T.R.O.B.I.) champion American elm tree lives in Avondale Forest near Rathdrum, County Wicklow, Ireland.

Wych Elm Ulmus glabra
 "Joe Pullen's Tree", a wych elm (Ulmus glabra) in Oxford, was planted in about 1700 by the Rev. Josiah Pullen, vice president of Magdalen Hall. Josiah Pullen "used to Walk to that place every day, sometimes twice a day", according to diarist Thomas Hearne. The famous essayist Richard Steele (1672–1729) said his regular walks as an undergraduate to the elm with Pullen helped him to reach a "florid old age". The elm became famous at Oxford and its fame grew with its age. In November 1795, Gentleman's Magazine reported that "Joe Pullen, the famous elm, upon Headington hills, had one of its large branches torn off and carried to a great distance." When new parliamentary district boundaries were drawn after the Reform Act 1832, the tree was named as a landmark helping to mark the boundary of the Parliamentary Borough of Oxford. In early 1847, the owner of the property arranged to have the tree torn down, and work started on it before protests put an end to the plan. By 1892, however, rot had set in, and the tree was torn down to its (large and tall) "stump". Early in the morning of 13 October 1909, vandals set fire to the stump. A plaque was soon after installed on the side wall of Davenport House in Cuckoo Lane, marking the spot. It reads: Near this spot stood the famous elm planted by the Rev. Josiah Pullen about 1680 and known as Jo Pullen's Tree. Destroyed by fire on 13 October 1909.

Dutch Elm Ulmus × hollandica
 The Magdalen Elm, a great elm in the Grove of Magdalen College, Oxford, photographed by Henry Taunt in 1900 and said by Elwes to be the largest elm in Great Britain, was long believed to be wych but was found on examination by Elwes and Henry to be a Huntingdon-type hybrid that at c.300 years old pre-dated the cultivation of Huntingdon Elm. When it blew down in 1911, by Elwes' measurements it had been 142 feet high and 27 feet in girth at five feet, and contained 2787 cubic feet of timber.
 The Great Saling Elm. With a girth of 6.86 m and a height of 40 m, the elm on Great Saling Green, Great Saling, near Braintree, Essex, identified by R. H. Richens (1983) as an Ulmus × hollandica hybrid, was reputed to be the largest elm in England, before succumbing to Dutch Elm Disease in the 1980s. A photograph of the tree can be found (plate 402) in Elwes & Henry's Trees of Great Britain & Ireland, published in 1913, wherein it is identified as U. nitens (U. minor subsp. minor).
 The Oudemanhuispoort Elm. 34.6 m tall and 4.4 m in girth, this Ulmus × hollandica 'Belgica' in Oudemanhuispoort, Amsterdam, planted in 1895, is the largest elm in the Netherlands.
 "The MooCoo Tree,", in Athens, Georgia, stands in front of Theta Chi Fraternity at the University of Georgia;  it is one of the few Dutch Elm (Ulmus × hollandica) trees in North America east of the Mississippi. Students are known to engage in the "MooCoo Challenge," which consists climbing into the Elm and consuming twelve beers in less than 2 hours before coming down.

Field Elm Ulmus minor

 The Metaxades Elm. An ancient Field Elm (Ulmus minor) stood until recently in the village square of Metaxades, Thrace, Greece. Having abandoned their original village in 1286 after cholera outbreaks, the villagers re-founded it in the hills where a young elm grew beside a spring. The elm (reputedly the original) and fountain were until recently the focal-point of the village.
 The Biscarrosse Elm. Reputedly planted in 1350, this Field Elm (Ulmus minor) survived in the centre of Biscarrosse in the Landes region of south-west France until 2010, when it finally succumbed to Dutch elm disease. Its habit of producing a circle of white epicormic leaves on the bole every spring gave rise to a local legend. The 'white wreath' was said to be related to the public humiliation in 1450 and death beneath the tree of a local girl wrongly accused of adultery.
 The Elm of Bettange. Reputedly planted in 1593, this Field Elm (Ulmus minor) in the village of Bettange in the Moselle region of France is now a wreck  In so far as measurements can be taken of its ruined bole, its girth has been estimated at over 6 m.
 "L’Olmo di Lando", known in Italy as "L’Olmo Bello" (:The Beautiful Elm). This shapely, open-grown Field Elm (Ulmus minor) stood at Ostra near Senigallia in the Italian Marches, where its "montagna di verde" (:mountain of greenery) attracted many admirers, who bought its portrait in postcards. It had a 110 m crown-circumference, a 35 m crown-diameter, and a 6,30 m bole-girth at ground level. It was felled in 1935 when it lost its looks and threatened to damage those of the people standing beneath it. A ring-count established that it was over 400 years old.
 The Mergozzo Elm. A four-hundred-year-old Ulmus minor, 5.55 metres in girth, survives in the town of Mergozzo in Piedmont. 'L'olmo di Mergozzo', like its French counterparts 'l'orme de Biscarosse' and 'l’orme de Bettange', is hollowed out by age, its life prolonged by pollarding.
 The "bleeding" elms of Saint Nicholas the Martyr, Thessaly. In the grounds of the Greek Orthodox monastery of Saint Nicholas near Vounaina (Βούναινα), Thessaly, built on the site of the slaughter, c. 720, by marauding Avars, of the Byzantine ascetic St Nicholas the Martyr (Άγιος Νικόλαος ο εν Βουνένοις) and his followers, stands a group of revered elms that in May on the anniversary of the martyrdom "bleed" a purplish fluid, believed by many of the Orthodox faith to have miraculous healing properties. The phenomenon, possibly related to wetwood, attracts large crowds to the monastery every year.

English Elm Ulmus procera

 The Preston Twins in Preston Park, Brighton, England, are the two oldest English elms in the world. Both trees are aged over 400 years and exceed  in girth. They have been regularly pollarded for many years and both trunks are hollow. In 2019, Brighton and Hove City Council announced that one of the trees was to be felled due to an infestation of Dutch Elm Disease.

Other, unidentified elms
 The Langton Elm in Sherwood Forest, Nottinghamshire, was a large elm tree that "was for a long time so remarkable as to have a special keeper", according to a book published in 1881.

See also
 List of individual trees

References

Elm